William Lawrence DeVenzio (August 2, 1924 – January 1, 1969) was an American professional basketball player. He played in the National Basketball League in six games for the Syracuse Nationals during the 1947–48 season and averaged 1.8 points per game.

DeVenzio also played one year of minor league baseball, for the Hannibal Pilots during the 1947 season. In college he had transferred from Geneva College, where he lettered for three years in basketball, to Eastern Kentucky University because Geneva did not have a baseball team at the time. While at Eastern Kentucky he played basketball for one season and baseball for two.

References

1924 births
1969 deaths
American men's basketball players
Baseball pitchers
Baseball players from Pennsylvania
Basketball players from Pennsylvania
Eastern Kentucky Colonels baseball players
Eastern Kentucky Colonels men's basketball players
Geneva Golden Tornadoes men's basketball players
Guards (basketball)
Hannibal Pilots players
People from Coraopolis, Pennsylvania
Syracuse Nationals players